Robin Gray Newton (born 21 December 1945) is a Unionist politician from Northern Ireland representing the Democratic Unionist Party (DUP). He was a Member of the Northern Ireland Assembly (MLA) for East Belfast from 2003 to 2022, and was a junior minister in the Office of the First Minister and deputy First Minister from 2009 to 2011.

Newton is a chief executive of a management consultancy company and a member of the East Belfast Partnership Board, which promotes economic development in East Belfast. He served as Speaker of the Northern Ireland Assembly from 12 May 2016 until 11 January 2020. He and his wife Carole have two children.

Political career
Newton was first elected to Belfast City Council in 1985. Newton is chairman of the Waterfront Hall board. He was an unsuccessful candidate in East Belfast in the 1996 Northern Ireland Forum election. He was elected as a DUP member of the Northern Ireland Assembly for East Belfast in 2003.

After the 1998 Northern Ireland Assembly election, he was the deputy chair of the Development Committee. He takes particular interest in housing matters, the elderly, health services and employment opportunities. Newton is the DUP party spokesperson for Enterprise, Trade and Investment. On 12 May 2016 he was elected Speaker of the Northern Ireland Assembly.

In 2022, Newton was deselected as a DUP candidate and as a result will not contest the 2022 Assembly election.

Executive
First Minister and DUP leader Peter Robinson announced on 22 June 2009 that Robin Newton would replace Jeffrey Donaldson as junior minister in the Office of the First Minister and deputy First Minister at the beginning of the new assembly term in September 2009. This reshuffle took place due to Robinson's plans to phase out "double jobbing" amongst elected representatives. Newton was sworn in as junior minister by the speaker, William Hay, on 1 July 2009, and served until 16 May 2011. From 2011 until 2012, he was a Political Member of the Northern Ireland Policing Board.

References

High Sheriffs of Belfast
Living people
Democratic Unionist Party MLAs
Northern Ireland MLAs 2003–2007
Northern Ireland MLAs 2007–2011
Northern Ireland MLAs 2011–2016
Junior ministers of the Northern Ireland Assembly (since 1999)
Members of Belfast City Council
Place of birth missing (living people)
1945 births
Northern Ireland MLAs 2016–2017
Politicians from Belfast
Speakers of the Northern Ireland Assembly
Northern Ireland MLAs 2017–2022